Troy Ethan Wilson (born November 22, 1970) is a former defensive lineman who played in the National Football League (NFL).  Wilson had a seven-year career playing defensive end for the San Francisco 49ers, Denver Broncos, New Orleans Saints, and the Chicago Bears.

Troy Wilson attended Pittsburg State University from 1989 to 1992, helping Pittsburg State win the 1991 NCAA Division II national championship.

Wilson was drafted by the San Francisco 49ers in the 7th round (194th overall) of the 1993 NFL Entry Draft.  Wilson was a member of the 1994 San Francisco 49ers Super Bowl championship team.

Wilson played for the Tampa Bay Storm in the Arena Football League (AFL) in 2002 and 2003. He was a member of the 2003 Arena Bowl championship team.

References

External links
Troy Wilson Arena Football League profile at ArenaFan.com

1970 births
Living people
American football defensive linemen
Players of American football from Kansas
Chicago Bears players
Denver Broncos players
New Orleans Saints players
Sportspeople from Topeka, Kansas
Pittsburg State Gorillas football players
San Francisco 49ers players
Tampa Bay Storm players
Ed Block Courage Award recipients